Karevangah (also Romanized as Kārevāngāh) is a village in Javar Rural District, in the Central District of Kuhbanan County, Kerman Province, Iran. At the 2006 census, its population was 65, in 21 families.

References 

Populated places in Kuhbanan County